Meril-Prothom Alo Award for Best TV Actress is given by Meril-Prothom Alo as part of its annual Meril-Prothom Alo Awards for Bengali television actress.

Multiple winners
 6 Wins: Nusrat Imrose Tisha
 3 Wins: Bipasha Hayat
 2 Wins: Shomi Kaiser, Aupee Karim, Tareen Jahan, Jaya Ahsan, Mehazabien Chowdhury

Multiple nominees
The following actresses have received multiple Best TV Actress nominations (* indicates no wins):

Winners and nominees

1990s

2000s

2010s

See also
 Meril-Prothom Alo Critics Choice Award for Best TV Actress
 Meril-Prothom Alo Critics Award for Best Film Actress
 Meril-Prothom Alo Awards

References

External links

TV Actress